(released as Star Fleet in the UK) is a Japanese marionette tokusatsu TV series created by manga artist Go Nagai, and produced by Cosmo Productions and Jin Productions.

Background
This show can be considered somewhat of a cross between the work of Go Nagai and Ken Ishikawa's Getter Robo and Star Wars. As in Getter Robo, the show's protagonists ride three vehicles that combine into a giant robot. Big Dai X, the robot in X-Bomber, is more similar to the kind seen in the popular Super Sentai series than a regular Nagai robot.

The show's opening and ending theme songs ("Soldier in the Space" and "The Drifting Galaxy", respectively) were performed by the Japanese hard rock group Bow Wow, while Kazutaka Tazaki (of The Bach Revolution) and Nakayuki Sakuraba (of Adbaloon) provided additional music for the show.

The puppets of X-Bomber were controlled from below the set using rods, and as a consequence were generally seen only from the waist up. Whereas Gerry Anderson's series were episodic in nature, X-Bomber had an overall story arc, with sub-plots and new characters being introduced as the series progressed, leading to a definite end. Similarly, rod puppets were used in Gerry Anderson's 1967 series Captain Scarlet and the Mysterons canned as "under-control" puppets due to their inability to walk-whereas everywhere else they were marionettes. Anderson would later use Rod puppets in Terrahawks.

Star Fleet
X-Bomber was renamed Star Fleet and dubbed by English speaking actors for broadcast in the United Kingdom on ITV. Due to its broadcast slot, the advertisements shown before, during and after each episode frequently included children's Public Information Films. The series was also broadcast as such on first-run syndication in the United States.

Drawing heavily on diverse influences such as Star Wars, Japanese Anime and Gerry Anderson's various "Supermarionation" series, the show ran for twenty-four half-hour episodes (twenty-five in Japan - the eighteenth episode, titled Bloody Mary's Promotion, was not included in the English version, as it consisted mainly of flashbacks).
The English version's theme song was composed by Paul Bliss, and was later covered by Queen member Brian May and Van Halen guitarist Eddie Van Halen. This was released under the name "Star Fleet Project".

The screenplay was adapted for English by Michael Sloan, who in later years would create the popular TV series The Master and The Equalizer.

Actress Denise Bryer ("Commander Makara") and editor Tony Lenny both went on to collaborate with Gerry Anderson and Christopher Burr making another memorable sci-fi series, Terrahawks.

Plot outline
The year is 2999 and the Earth is at peace following the Space Wars. The safety of the human race is ensured by Earth Defense Force (EDF). Shortly before the turn of the fourth millennium, the peace is broken by the appearance of a gigantic alien battle cruiser. Powerless to defend itself, the EDF's Pluto base is completely destroyed and the evil Commander Makara reveals that the same fate awaits the Earth unless the mysterious F-Zero-One is handed over to her.

Unaware of the nature of F-Zero-One and fearing retribution, the EDF presses into action an untested, incomplete weapon, codenamed X-Project, from its hidden moon-base. The X-Project is revealed to be a powerfully-armed spacecraft named X-Bomber.

The series then follows the adventures of the crew of the X-Bomber, namely Doctor Benn, Shiro Hagen, Barry Hercules and John Lee who are joined by PPA, Lamia and her guardian Kirara. They set off to discover the nature of the F-Zero-One and try to protect it from the increasingly desperate Commander Makara and her menacing overlord, the Imperial Master.

Eventually it is revealed that Lamia herself is the mysterious F-Zero-One, a powerful alien destined to bring peace to the galaxy at the turn of the millennium. The series continues with Lamia gradually discovering her true nature and powers while the Imperial Alliance attempts to capture her and destroy the X-Bomber. The series climaxes with the X-Bomber crew destroying Commander Makara  and Lamia finally confronting and defeating the Imperial Master and bringing peace to the universe.

Episodes

Source(s)

Some Episodes for the English version of the series were either renamed to fit the changes made or badly translated from the original titles. Although the episodes weren't officially named during the original series' run, the English DVD release confirms their titles.

English voice cast 

Jay Benedict - Shirō Hagen
Constantine Gregory - Barry Hercules
Mark Rolston - John Lee
Peter Marinker - Dr. Benn Robinson
Liza Ross - Princess Lamia
John Baddeley - PPA (Perfectly Programmed Android)
Kevin Brennan - General Kyle
Garrick Hagon - Captain Carter
Denise Bryer - Commander Makara
Sean Barrett - Captain Orion
Jacob Witkin - The Imperial Master
Al Matthews - Caliban and Professor Hagen (uncredited)

The English cast list of Star Fleet was relatively small, with most voice actors doing the extra voices in the series as well. Credits were only made based on the main characters who appeared in the first episode, with the credits being reused each episode afterwards. As a result, Al Matthews was uncredited from his role later in the series.

Crew 
Planned & Produced by Kimio Ikeda & Keisuke Fujikawa
Created by Gou Nagai
Serialized in Shogakukan's TV-Kun and Other Learning Magazines
Written by Keisuke Fujikawa
Music by Bow Wow, Kazutaka Tasaki & Nobuyuki Sakuraba
Theme Songs "Soldier in the Space" & "Galaxy Drifting"
Lyrics by Keisuke Fujikawa
Music Kyoji Yamamoto
Arranged by Bach Revolution
Performed by Bow Wow
Directed by Michio Mikami, Akira Takahashi, Kiyotaka Matsumoto & Noriyasu Ogami

Staff 
Camera Operator: Ryuji Kawasaki 
Lighting Cameraman: Yoichi Takahashi 
Production Designers: Akira Takahashi, Kyoko Heya & Shinichi Noro 
Puppets Operator: Fumiaki Hayashi 
Assistant Directors: Kiyotaka Matsumoto, Tetsuhiro Matori & Tadaaki Kozen 
Audio Director: Sadayoshi Fujino
Scripter Girl: Yoshiko Hori
Editor: Yoshihiko Yamamoto (Araki Prod.)

Visual effects unit 
Directors of Visual Effects Kiyotaka Matsumoto & Yasumasa Abe 
Director of Photography Yasumasa Abe 
Lighting Masao Tsuchida 
Art Director Minoru Ohashi 
Practical Effects GIVS
Assistant Director Hitoshi Ueda
Compositing by Japan Visual Creation

Post production 
Sound Effects: Fizz Sound Creation
Co-Ordinator: Kunio Kuwahara
Recorded at: NEWJAPAN Studio
Audio Produced by: Omnibus Promotions 
Assistant Producer: Masahide Baba 
Production Manager: Fumio Takahashi 
In Charge Of Production: Ikubun Cai
Film Processing: Tokyo Processing Offices
Produced by: Fuji Television, Jin Productions & Cosmo Productions

English dubbing 
Executive Producer: Kevin Morrison
Produced & Directed by: Louis Elsman & Peter Marinker
Written by: Michael Sloan
Music: Paul Bliss
Co-Ordinator: Annie Wallbank
Assistant Producer: Nicola Thurgood
Supervising Editor: Tony Lenny
Dialogue Editor: Roy Taylor
Assistant Editing: Roy Helmrich & Bryan Tilling
Dialogue Synchronization: Maggie Dickie
Sound Recordist: Doug Hurring
Recorded at: Anvil Studios
Sound Effects: Theatre Three Productions & Cinesound Effects Library
Prints: Rank Film Laboratories
Titles: G.S.E. Ltd.
Produced by: Leah International & ITV 1
Distributed by: Itoman And Company

French dubbing (1983) 
Presented by Intercine TV 
Written by: Alain Gedovius
Music: Shuki Levy and Haim Saban
French Version: MPS
Recorded at: Auditorium Ltc.

In comics
Two relatively unknown manga were also created in 1980.

British comic magazine Look-In ran strips based on Star Fleet for 32 weeks beginning in January 1983.

Home video
Both sets also contained one of two compilation movies created from Star Fleet, in English with Japanese subtitles. Both sets have since gone out of print. On April 24, 2013, Bandai Visual released a Remastered DVD-Box of the series featuring enhanced and remastered scenes.

In Bulgaria The Thalian Space Wars and Space Quest For F-01 tapes were released by Multi Video Center with Bulgarian dub.

In the US, eight video tapes were released which also contained compilations of the series' episodes, albeit in a less-drastically edited format.

It is possible to obtain VCD copies on eBay. These are usually taken from the American Tapes and tend to be of poor quality.

In the UK, only three Star Fleet video tapes were ever released. The first and rarest contained episodes 4 and 5 of the series. The other two were compilation movies entitled The Thalian Space Wars and Space Quest For F-01. The series has not been repeated on UK television since the late 1980s.

Included in the DVD set are all 24 episodes, remastered, and restored to their original UK broadcast format. Beyond the episodes, the set also includes stills and a double-sided poster, as well as a comicbook and a comprehensive 'making of' documentary, which includes contributions from series creator Go Nagai, Dr Benn voice artist Peter Marinker, Brian May, Paul Bliss and Gerry Anderson.

Further to the DVD release, Paul Bliss' soundtrack has been released on CD and is available via mail order.

Discotek Media announced in June 2016 that they will release the dubbed series on DVD in the United States on December 20, 2016. It was later delayed for a February 2017 release.

They later announced in January 2019 that they will release both that version and the original version on SD Blu-ray in the United States on March 26, 2019.

References

External links

SFXB: Star Fleet / X-Bomber Homepage
F-Zero-One: Star Fleet / X-Bomber site
  Fabulous Films-the distributors site
X Bomber at allcinema
X Bomber at the World of Go Nagai webpage
 

1980 Japanese television series debuts
1981 Japanese television series endings
Discotek Media
English-language television shows
Fuji TV original programming
Go Nagai
ITV children's television shows
Shōnen manga
Space adventure television series
Super robot anime and manga
Japanese television shows featuring puppetry
Television series by ITV Studios
Television series set in the future
Tokusatsu television series